Olmsted is a village in Pulaski County, Illinois, along the Ohio River. The population was 299 at the 2000 census.

Geography
Olmsted is located at  (37.180733, -89.086431).

Demographics

As of the census of 2000, there were 333 people, 139 households, and 85 families residing in the village. The racial makeup of the village was 80.94% White, 18.06% African American, 0.33% Native American, 0.67% from other races. Hispanic or Latino of any race were 0.67% of the population.

There were 139 households, out of which 23.7% had children under the age of 18 living with them, 47.5% were married couples living together, 11.5% had a female householder with no husband present, and 38.8% were non-families. 36.7% of all households were made up of individuals, and 20.1% had someone living alone who was 65 years of age or older. The average household size was 2.15 and the average family size was 2.79.

In the village, the population was spread out, with 21.4% under the age of 18, 7.0% from 18 to 24, 24.4% from 25 to 44, 26.4% from 45 to 64, and 20.7% who were 65 years of age or older. The median age was 43 years. For every 100 females, there were 76.9 males. For every 100 females age 18 and over, there were 80.8 males.

The median income for a household in the village was $19,833, and the median income for a family was $32,188. Males had a median income of $26,875 versus $23,750 for females. The per capita income for the village was $13,615. About 16.9% of families and 21.7% of the population were below the poverty line, including 32.8% of those under the age of eighteen and 16.9% of those 65 or over.

See also
List of cities and towns along the Ohio River

References

Villages in Pulaski County, Illinois
Villages in Illinois
Illinois populated places on the Ohio River